Bloomington Township is a township in Butler County, Kansas, USA.  As of the 2000 census, its population was 544.

History
Bloomington Township was established in 1872.

Geography
According to the USGS, it contains one cemetery, Bogle.

The stream of Hickory Creek runs through this township.

Further reading

References

 USGS Geographic Names Information System (GNIS)

External links
 City-Data.com

Townships in Butler County, Kansas
Townships in Kansas